Viruta y Capulina, performed by Marco Antonio Campos and Gaspar Henaine, were a Mexican double act featured in film, television, theatre, radio, and comic books from 1956 to 1966.

Career
Viruta and Capulina's first feature film, Se los chupó la bruja, was shot in 1957 and released the following year by Películas Nacionales. Upon viewing the film for the first time during a private screening, Capulina said that he felt "desolate" and told his wife that he would "never again work in film." However, the film was successful at the box office; screening in theaters for eight weeks. 

The films of Viruta and Capulina were often associated with "bad quality" films and television programs. In response, Capulina admitted that he and Viruta never had "the slightest freedom to choose the screenplays."

Films

References

External links

Mexican comedy duos
Fictional film duos
Fictional Mexican people
Male characters in film
Film characters introduced in 1957
Comedy film characters
Comedy television characters